Lowell Cemetery is a cemetery located in Lowell, Massachusetts.  Founded in 1841 and located on the banks of the Concord River, the cemetery is one of the oldest garden cemeteries in the nation, inspired by Mount Auburn Cemetery in Cambridge, Massachusetts.  Many of Lowell's wealthy industrialists are buried here, under ornate Victorian tombstones.  A  portion of the  cemetery was listed on the National Register of Historic Places in 1998.

Description and history
The cemetery is located in the central eastern part of the city, roughly bounded on the north by Fort Hill Park, on the east by Shedd Park, on the south by railroad tracks, and on the west by the Concord River, from which it is separated by Lawrence Street, where its historic main gate is located.  It occupies 84 acres of rolling terrain, much of which has been developed.  The main gate is a monumental granite structure designed by C. W. Painter and built in 1862. There is a secondary gate on Knapp Avenue at the cemetery's northeast corner, which was added in 1905.  There are two buildings in the cemetery: the Talbot Memorial Chapel (1885) and the Superintendent's Office (1887), both Gothic Revival structures designed by Boston architect Frederick Stickney.

Roadways in the cemetery were laid out to take advantage of the natural terrain, occasionally providing vistas.  The main circulation route, Washington Avenue, roughly encircles the property, with several roads providing access across the central areas.  The cemetery was laid out in 1841 to a design by George P. Worcester, a civil engineer, applying principles of the rural cemetery movement that was then just coming into vogue.  The cemetery has a wide variety of funerary art in diverse styles, from typical Victorian forms to the Egyptian Revival and Art Deco.  Many prominent Lowell residents of the 19th and 20th centuries are interred here.

Notable burials
 Henry Livermore Abbott - Brevet Brigadier General in the Union Army during the American Civil War
 Charles Herbert Allen - Congressman; First US civilian governor of Puerto Rico
 Frederick Ayer - Industrialist; co-founder of the American Woolen Company
 James Cook Ayer - patent medicine tycoon
 Benjamin Dean - Congressman
 James B. Francis - chief engineer of Proprietors of Locks and Canals
 Frederic T. Greenhalge - Congressman and Governor of Massachusetts
 Chauncey Langdon Knapp - Congressman
 John Locke - Congressman
 John Jacob Rogers - Congressman
 Edith Nourse Rogers - Congressman
 Augustin Thompson - inventor of Moxie
 Paul Tsongas - United States Senator
 Tappan Wentworth - Congressman
 Robert Leighton - Owner of Norcross and Leighton

Gallery

See also
National Register of Historic Places listings in Lowell, Massachusetts

References

External links

 

Cemeteries on the National Register of Historic Places in Massachusetts
Buildings and structures in Lowell, Massachusetts
Cemeteries in Middlesex County, Massachusetts
Tourist attractions in Lowell, Massachusetts
National Register of Historic Places in Lowell, Massachusetts
Historic districts on the National Register of Historic Places in Massachusetts
1841 establishments in Massachusetts
Rural cemeteries